Elk Creek is an unincorporated community and census-designated place in Spencer County, Kentucky, United States. Its population was 1,539 as of the 2010 census.

Geography
Elk Creek was, as late as 1955, the site of a church and cemetery, as well as a general store.

Demographics

History
Morrison Heady (1829-1915), poet and author, was born in Elk Creek.

F. Hiner Dale (1888-1969), attorney and judge, was born in Elk Creek.

References

Unincorporated communities in Spencer County, Kentucky
Unincorporated communities in Kentucky
Census-designated places in Spencer County, Kentucky
Census-designated places in Kentucky